María López Hidalgo (born 6 April 1988), also known as Marieta, is a Spanish former footballer who last played for Atlético Madrid in the Primera División. Her position was midfielder.

Career
Marieta was frequently injured during her career. On 2 March 2007, after having spent eight months recovering from a previous injury, she tore a cruciate ligament in her right knee during a training session with Sporting Plaza de Argel. It was at this club that she first gained the nickname "Marieta", due to being the youngest of the two players called 'María' in the team. After Sporting Plaza de Argel, she would spend three years playing for Prainsa Zaragoza before transferring to Atlético Madrid in 2011. Marieta continued to suffer injuries to her knee, the final one being in February 2013 against Barcelona. The following June, following doctor's advice, she announced her decision to retire from football. That same month, Atlético Madrid paid tribute to her in an event where she received a standing ovation from over 550 people and a video was shown with highlights of her two years at the club.

Personal life
Following her retirement, Marieta spent more time riding horses, a hobby that she first learned at the age of four. She also worked as a DJ under the stagename "María Lopezh".

References

Living people
Spanish women's footballers
Atlético Madrid Femenino players
Women's association football midfielders
Villarreal CF (women) players
Zaragoza CFF players
Primera División (women) players
1988 births
Sporting Plaza de Argel players